Anna Arkadianou (born 6 June 2001) is a Greek tennis player.

She has a career-high WTA singles ranking of 1202 achieved on 26 November 2018. She also has a career-high WTA doubles ranking of 848 achieved on 5 August 2019.

Arkadianou represents Greece at the Fed Cup, where she has a win-loss record of 0–2. She played in her first match against British players Harriet Dart and Katie Swan.

References

External links
 
 
 

2001 births
Living people
Greek female tennis players
Competitors at the 2018 Mediterranean Games
Mediterranean Games competitors for Greece
Sportspeople from Athens
Florida State Seminoles women's tennis players